Cihan Erdal is a Turkish Sociology pursuing his PhD at Carleton University in Ottawa, who was imprisoned in Turkey between September 2020-June 2021 due to his early life involvement with the pro-Kurdish People's Democratic Party following a politically-motivated mass arrest.

Detention by Turkish government
On 25 September 2020, Erdal was one of dozens of people arrested and accused of links to terrorism, only hours after he arrived in Istanbul to conduct research for his doctorate. Most of these people had been supportive of the People's Democratic Party (HDP), a pro-Kurdish, leftist political party in Turkey. Erdal is a Canadian permanent resident, and his arrest was condemned by numerous Canadian organisations, including his university and unions like the UNPGE. Erdal was arrested within hours of landing in Turkey, and he was held in solitary confinement for the first 26 days of his detention.

The Department of Sociology at Carleton University condemned Erdal's arrest, saying that "The charges stem from events back in 2014, which the Turkish government are using to continue persecuting members of the leftist HDP political party, the third largest party in Turkey’s parliament". Erdal was "carrying out research for his doctoral dissertation on youth-led social movements in Europe when anti-terror police burst into his rental flat at 9 a.m. and hauled him away", according to Al Monitor journalist Amberin Zaman. In April of 2021, a judge denied Erdal pre-trial bail, forcing him to remain in prison up until his trial date despite the protest of human rights advocates.

Release and return to Canada
Erdal was released from custody in June 2021, but remained in Turkey at the time while awaiting permission from Turkey to leave the country. After several months, he instead found political asylum in a third country after walking hours from where he was located in Turkey, and was about to contact the Canadian consulat from a border camp in order to arrange his return to Canada. Erdal returned to Canada in September in 2022.

Research career
Carleton University has written of Erdal's graduate studies career that, "Erdal's M.A. thesis focused on the reproduction of abilik (big brotherhood), a form of institutionalized hierarchy based on age, experience, and gender faced by youth in the left political space of Turkey in the 2000s." In 2020, Erdal received an SSHRC Doctoral scholarship from the Canadian government. In 2022 Erdal contributed a chapter to the book Young People, Radical Democracy and Community Development (Rethinking Community Development), edited by Janet Batsleer, Harriet Rowley, and Demet Lüküslü, published by Policy Press.

Personal life
Erdal is a member of the LGBT community, and there were concern raised for his treatment by Turkish authorities during his detention because of this. He became a permanent resident of Canada prior to his detention.

References 

Turkish people
Ottawa University alumni
Year of birth missing (living people)
Living people
Turkish prisoners and detainees
Turkish sociologists